E40 may refer to:
 Nimzo-Indian Defense, Encyclopaedia of Chess Openings code
 European route E40, a road extending from France to Kazakhstan
 E-40 (born 1967), American rapper
 GE E40, a locomotive
 E40, the name for the fuel blend of 40% ethanol and 60% gasoline
 E40 screw, a type of Edison screw
 HMS E40, a 1916 British E class submarine